Monochasma is a genus of flowering plants belonging to the family Orobanchaceae.

Its native range is Southern China and Japan.

Species
Species:

Monochasma savatieri 
Monochasma sheareri

References

Orobanchaceae
Orobanchaceae genera